Jacob Onsrud (23 February 1882 – 4 November 1971) was a Norwegian rifle shooter competing in the early 20th century. He won an Olympic silver medal at the 1920 Summer Olympics in Antwerp for team, military rifle, 300 + 600 m.

References

1971 deaths
1882 births
Norwegian male sport shooters
ISSF rifle shooters
Olympic silver medalists for Norway
Olympic shooters of Norway
Shooters at the 1920 Summer Olympics
Olympic medalists in shooting
Medalists at the 1920 Summer Olympics
20th-century Norwegian people